Sheybukhta is a rural locality (a selo) and the administrative center of Sheybukhtovskoye Rural Settlement, Mezhdurechensky District, Vologda Oblast, Russia. The population was 5 as of 2002. There are 12 streets.

Geography 
Sheybukhta is located 21 km southwest of Shuyskoye (the district's administrative centre) by road. Tupitsyno is the nearest rural locality.

References 

Rural localities in Mezhdurechensky District, Vologda Oblast